The Asilomar Conference on Beneficial AI was a conference organized by the Future of Life Institute, held January 5–8, 2017, at the Asilomar Conference Grounds in California. More than 100 thought leaders and researchers in economics, law, ethics, and philosophy met at the conference, to address and formulate principles of beneficial AI. Its outcome was the creation of a set of guidelines for AI research – the 23 Asilomar AI Principles.

Notes and references

Philosophy of artificial intelligence
Ethics of science and technology
Events in the Monterey Bay Area